Noah De Ridder (born 8 October 2003) is a Belgian footballer who plays for Gent in the Belgian Pro League as a midfielder.

Career
Raised in Buggenhout, he attended Topsportschool in Ghent. He came through the academy system at Gent and has represented the Belgium national under-17 football team. He signed his first professional contract in November 2021. From the start of the 2022–23 season Gent head coach Hein Vanhaezebrouck gave young players such as Ibrahim Salah, Malick Fofana and De Ridder the chance to train with the first team. De Ridder made his league debut for the Gent first team on 11 September 2022 against Zulte Waregem.

References

External links

 

2003 births
Living people
Belgian footballers
Belgium youth international footballers
Association football midfielders
K.A.A. Gent players
Belgian Pro League players
Belgian National Division 1 players